Mount Corey is a mountain  east of the Chester Mountains in the Ford Ranges of Marie Byrd Land. It was discovered by a Byrd Antarctic Expedition sledging party which visited the area in November 1934, and was named for Stevenson Corey, a member of the sledge party.

References 

 www.coreymount.com

Mountains of Marie Byrd Land